William Henry Schmalz (December 31, 1862May 9, 1933) was an insurance company executive and politician in Ontario, Canada. He served as mayor of Berlin (later renamed to Kitchener) from 1911 to 1912.

Early life and education
Schmalz's parents came to Ontario from Hesse in 1854. In 1878, he joined the Economical Mutual Fire Insurance Company as a policy writer. In 1908, he became managing director. Schmalz worked for the company until 1933. Schmalz served 18 years on the hospital board, including three as president. He was also a member of the Board of Trade. With W.J. Morris, he managed the Berliner Journal.

Personal life
He married Eleanor Oelschlager. His son William Henry Eugene Schmalz was an architect and designed the first city hall for the city of Kitchener.

Career
He was one of the foremost Canadian philatelists of his time, owning 45,000 stamps. Schmalz was a singer in a number of choirs and played cornet in the Berlin orchestra. He died in 1933 and was buried at Mount Hope Cemetery in Kitchener.

References 

1862 births
1933 deaths
Mayors of Kitchener, Ontario
Canadian people of German descent
Burials at Mount Hope Cemetery, Kitchener, Ontario